The Cookie Jar Kids Network (formerly DiC Kids Network) was a syndicated children's programming block that airs selected Cookie Jar Group shows on local Fox, The CW, MyNetworkTV, and independent stations to provide them with a source of E/I programming required by federal law. The block is known on air as simply Cookie Jar. It was first formed in 2003 as the DIC Kids Network, and was syndicated by Tribune Entertainment from 2003 to 2008, and then by Ascent Media from 2008 to 2011.

National ad sales for the syndicated blocks were handled by Tribune Entertainment with barter basis available. Ads could have stitched together other programs throughout the three blocks.

History

In February 2003, DIC announced three syndicated children's programming E/I blocks called DIC Kids Network with 200 stations including those owned by Tribune, Sinclair, Clear Channel and Cox signed up to carry the blocks. Margaret Loesch and Donald Roberts, a specialist in kids and media at Stanford University, help develop the blocks. By July, 400 stations had signed 3 to 5 year deals to air the block, and it was also announced that the block would launch on August 5th. With its three feeds, DIC Kids was on Fox, The WB and UPN affiliates and out fulfilled the networks' Saturday morning blocks by December 1.

On April 9, 2004, DIC acquired the North American broadcast rights to Ace Lightning from Alliance Atlantis, and would premiere the series on June 5th of that year. On the same day, Liberty's Kids was announced to be added to the block, alongside the return of Sabrina: The Animated Series. A holiday lineup consisting of specials and movies like A Christmas Carol and Inspector Gadget Saves Christmas was also planned. DIC also planned to offer up acquired programmes for the block as well.

In May 2004, DIC acquired the syndicated television rights to 26 select episodes of The Smurfs and the first three seasons of The Adventures of Captain Planet from Warner Bros. Domestic Television Distribution for a March 2005 broadcast window.

In mid 2008, the group announced that they would renew the focus of the block with an emphasis on offering DIC Entertainment programming to additional digital subchannels to meet their E/I needs. On May 20, 2008, it has been announced that DIC Entertainment would be acquired by Canada-based Cookie Jar. On June 23, 2008, the deal was completed, and the block was later relaunched as the Cookie Jar Kids Network in Early 2009. The block ceased to exist on October 27, 2011.

As of 2022, no known footage of the 2009-2011 block has been surfaced online, and the bumpers and content of the 2009-2011 block are considered lost media.

Programming
Notes:

-Shows marked with a * do not fulfill E/I requirements.
-The programming premiere and end dates are based on weekday broadcasts.

Lineup
All schedules correspond to markets which opted to carry DIC/Cookie Jar programming on weekdays. Except where affiliates opt to carry programming on weekends instead due to scheduling conflicts including paid programming, religious programming, and local morning newscasts. The block offered three separate exclusive programming feeds. This lineup only shows content that fulfill E/I requirements.

1This programming feed is exclusive to The WB 100+ and that feed was intended for areas where they didn't opt to carry DIC Kids Network programming C programs, and it also ran under the Kids' WB brand in those markets. The feed was dropped in late 2005.

2003-2004

2004-2005

2005-2006
Note: The WB 100+ dropped DIC Kids Network programming D in late 2005.

2006-2007
Note: Most stations transitioned from DIC Kids Network programming C to programming B while other stations dropped programming altogether possibly due to the 2006 United States broadcast television realignment.

2007-2008

2008-2009

2009-2010

2010-2011

Affiliate list
The following is a list of stations, which carried DIC/Cookie Jar Kids Network programming between 2003 and 2009.

Legend

  Light purple indicates stations ran DIC Kids Network programming A
  Pink indicates stations ran DIC Kids Network programming B
  Light yellow indicates stations ran DIC Kids Network programming C
  Light indigo indicates stations ran DIC Kids Network programming D

See also
 Cookie Jar TV (Cookie Jar's former Saturday morning children's block on CBS)
 Cookie Jar Toons (Cookie Jar's former daily children's block on This TV)

References

Television programming blocks
WildBrain